Nyapanyapa Yunupingu (1945 – 20 October 2021) was an Australian Yolngu painter and printmaker who lived and worked in the community at Yirrkala, Arnhem Land, in the Northern Territory. Yunupingu created works of art that drastically diverge from the customs of the Yolngu people and made waves within the art world as a result. Due to this departure from tradition within her oeuvre, Yunupingu's work had varying receptions from within her community and the broader art world.

Early life 
Yunupingu was a Yolŋu woman of the Gumatj clan and was born in Arnhem Land, Northern Territory, in 1945. She was the daughter of Yolŋu  artist and cultural leader Munggurrawuy Yunupingu (c.1905–1979), who was involved with the Yirrkala bark petitions.

Widowed, she was a wife of Djapu clan leader Djiriny Mununggurr, who died in 1977. She was the sister of Galarrwuy Yunupingu, Mandawuy Yunupingu, Gulumbu Yunupingu, Barrupu Yunupingu, Dhopiya Yunupingu, and Djakangu Yunupingu (and had many other siblings).

Will Stubbs, Buku-Larrŋgay Mulka Art Centre coordinator, said of Yunupingu and her art:

Growing up, Yunupingu worked on the mission with her sisters, herding dairy cattle and goats. She learned to paint by watching her father's painting process, although he did not officially pass on Miny'tji designs to her.

Art career 
Yunupingu worked through the Buku-Larrnggay Mulka Centre at Yirrkala.

Initial foray into painting 
Yunupingu began painting at The Yirrkala Printspace in 2007, beginning to work daily in the centre's outdoor courtyard. Her presence eventually attracted a group of artists to join her (dubbed the "Courtyard Ladies") which included Barrupu Yunupingu, Gulumbu Yunupingu, Nongirrna Marawili, Mulkun Wirrpanda, and Dhuwarrwarr Marika. Yunupingu's early work dealt with personal stories and experiences, creating narratives that were not inspired by ancestral stories or dreamings but rather by her own life or her family history. Her work met with much success with her breakout painting Incident at Mutpi 1975, 2008, which featured a depiction of her being mauled by a buffalo. The Mulka Project created a film to go along with the piece and the painting and film won the 2008 Wandjuk Marika Memorial 3D Award.

Mayilimiriw ("meaningless") paintings 
In 2009, after a dream in which the buffalo that had mauled Yunupingu in 1975 appeared to her, she vowed to never again paint a depiction of the traumatic event. She began instead for a period to create paintings that were devoid of figurative images. Rather, they focused on layering coloured cross-hatching, creating an artistic style that centred around the nature of creation in the moment.

White paintings 
Yunupingu's "white paintings" take this concept of mayilimiriw further. Produced from 2009–2010, this series of paintings are solely focused on rhythmic mark-making, excluding colour from the narrative and instead creating works that were uninhibited in their spontaneous nature. Rather than being a premeditated image, Yunupingu's resulting work was fully dependent on the moment, the texture and stroke varying depending on material factors such as the brush and paint she was using.

Figurative paintings 
Whilst most of her work falls into the category of mayilimiriw, Yunupingu has created newer works which do contain figurative references. Specifically, she has included ganyu (stars), which refer to the story of the seven sisters.

Process 
Yunupingu did not draft or plot her paintings, instead she relied on spontaneity and texture to create her works. Throughout her career as an artist she transitioned from creating razor-incised carvings of animals and spirits, to linocut prints, to bark paintings, and recently multimedia projections. Within her mayilimiriw paintings, Yunupingu created a structure to work from by adding in circles, lines, and shapes which she then surrounded with crosshatching, using red, pink, and white earth pigments.

Notable career moments 

 She had her first solo exhibition of bark paintings in 2008 at Sydney's Roslyn Oxley9 Gallery. Her work has been exhibited at the Biennale of Sydney in 2012 and 2016.
 In 2008, Yunupingu won the Wandjuk Marika Memorial 3D Prize at the National Aboriginal & Torres Strait Islander Art Awards with a piece that combined painting on eucalyptus bark with video to narrate a biographic event in which she was gored by a buffalo in 1975. Her paintings of being gored by a buffalo were the inspiration and backdrop for Nyapanyapa, a dance choreographed by Stephen Page for Bangarra Dance Theatre which toured the United States.
 In 2017, her abstract painting Lines was awarded the bark painting prize at the National Aboriginal & Torres Strait Islander Art Awards. The work was subsequently acquired by the Museum and Art Gallery of the Northern Territory (MAGNT), in Darwin.
 She was selected as one of the featured artists for the 2020 Australia-wide Know My Name initiative of the National Gallery of Australia.
 Starting on 23 May 2020 (later than scheduled owing to the COVID-19 pandemic in Australia) and running until 25 October 2020, a comprehensive solo exhibition of Yunupingu's work, the moment eternal: Nyapanyapa Yunupiŋu, was mounted at the Museum and Art Gallery of the Northern Territory. The exhibition featured more than 60 works, and was the first solo exhibition at MAGNT to feature work by an Aboriginal Australian artist. A catalogue to accompany the exhibition was published.
In 2021, Yunupingu won the Wynne Prize for Garak – Night Sky, and the National Gallery of Australia purchased two of her works for inclusion in Part Two of the Know My Name: Australian Women Artists 1900 to Now exhibition. Yunupingu died in Yirrkala on 20 October 2021.

Reception of art 
While Yunupingu's art has received many accolades and has seen success internationally, there is a certain level of puzzlement over her success within her own community.  Her paintings diverge from tradition and do not depict the traditional stories and dreamings of her people, nor their Minytji designs, thus they are seen by those within the culture as having "no power" and as something that is communicating purely with the Western art market rather than the Yolngu people. Despite this hesitancy within her own community, Yunupingu was trailblazing a new approach to art within her culture, creating a style and approach that is strictly her own.

Collections 

 Art Gallery of New South Wales
 Kluge-Ruhe Aboriginal Art Collection of the University of Virginia
 National Gallery of Australia 
 National Gallery of Victoria
 Queensland Art Gallery | Gallery of Modern Art

Significant exhibitions 

 2008: Once Upon A Time. Roslyn Oxley9 Gallery, Sydney.
2008: Nyapanyapa – Bark Paintings, Prints and Carvings. Nomad Art Productions, Darwin.
2010: In Sydney Again. Roslyn Oxley9 Gallery, Sydney.
2011: Birrka'. Roslyn Oxley9 Gallery, Sydney.
2012: New Work, Roslyn Oxley9 Gallery, Sydney.
2012–13: UnDisclosed: 2nd National Indigenous Art Triennial. National Gallery of Australia, Canberra, ACT; Cairns Regional Gallery, Cairns QLD; Anne & Gordon Samstag Museum of Art, at the University of South Australia, Adelaide SA; and the Western Plains Cultural Centre, Dubbo, NSW.
2012: Crossing Cultures: The Owen and Wagner Collection of Contemporary Aboriginal Australian Art at the Hood Museum of Art. Hood Museum of Art, Dartmouth College, Hanover, NH.
2014: The World is Not a Foreign Land. Ian Potter Museum of Art, University of Melbourne, Melbourne, VIC.
2014: My Sister's Ceremony. Roslyn Oxley9 Gallery, Sydney.
2015: Lawarra Maypa. Roslyn Oxley9 Gallery, Sydney.
2015: Nyapanyapa Yunupingu. Art Gallery of South Australia, Adelaide.
2016: Nyapanyapa Yunupingu. Roslyn Oxley9 Gallery, Sydney.
 2016–2019: Marking the Infinite: Contemporary Women Artists from Aboriginal Australia. Newcomb Art Museum, Tulane University, New Orleans, LA; Frost Art Museum, Florida International University, Miami, FL; Nevada Museum of Art, Reno, NV; The Phillips Collection, Washington, DC; and the Museum of Anthropology, University of British Columbia, Vancouver, BC, Canada.
2017: Nyapanyapa Yunupingu. Roslyn Oxley9 Gallery, Sydney.
2019: Ganyu. Roslyn Oxley9 Gallery, Sydney.
2020: 20/20: Shared Visions, Artbank, Sydney.
2020: the moment eternal: Nyapanyapa Yunipingu. Museum and Art Gallery of the Northern Territory, Darwin
2021: The Little Things. Roslyn Oxley9 Gallery, Sydney.

Awards 

 2008: 3D Award, 25th Telstra National Aboriginal and Torres Strait Islander Art Award
 2017: Bark Painting Award, 34th Telstra National Aboriginal and Torres Strait Islander Art Award
2021: Wynne Prize for Garak – night sky

Death 
Yunupingu died on 20 October 2021 in Yirrkala, Northern Territory, Australia.

References 

1945 births
2021 deaths
Yolngu people
Indigenous Australian artists
20th-century Australian women artists
20th-century Australian artists
Artists from the Northern Territory
21st-century Australian women
21st-century Australian people
Wynne Prize winners